The 1944 North Dakota gubernatorial election was held on November 7, 1944. Republican nominee Fred G. Aandahl defeated Democratic nominee William T. DePuy with 52.02% of the vote.

Primary elections
Primary elections were held on June 27, 1944.

Democratic primary

Candidates
William T. DePuy, former North Dakota Tax Commissioner

Results

Republican primary

Candidates
Fred G. Aandahl, State Senator
Alvin C. Strutz, Attorney General of North Dakota

Results

General election

Candidates
Major party candidates
Fred G. Aandahl, Republican 
William T. DePuy, Democratic

Other candidates
Alvin C. Strutz, Independent
A. M. Wiley, Prohibition

Results

References

1944
North Dakota
Gubernatorial
November 1944 events